Mittet is a small village in the northern part of Rauma Municipality in Møre og Romsdal county, Norway. It is located on the south shore of the Langfjorden. Mittet has a population of about 150. It has a grocery store, gas station, and a camping site.

The Mittetelva river runs through the village into the Langfjorden.  The river runs through the nearby Mittet valley and the river contains trout and salmon.

References

Villages in Møre og Romsdal
Rauma, Norway